The Third Fernández Vara Government is the incumbent regional government of Extremadura in Spain led by President Guillermo Fernández. It was formed in June 2019 after the regional election.

Government

References

2019 establishments in Extremadura
Cabinets established in 2019
Cabinets of Extremadura